Joseph T. Flanigan (June 15, 1894 – January 2, 1970) was a member of the Michigan House of Representatives 1951-1952 for Genesee County, 1st District. Born in Defiance County, Ohio, Flanigan served in the US Army during World War I.

After his discharge as a Sergeant with the Sixty-fifth Engineer Tank Corps in France during World War I, he moved to Flint, Michigan. There, he was known as "Flint's Number One Irishman" because of how he represented the city of Flint.

References

1894 births
1970 deaths
Military personnel from Michigan
United States Army personnel of World War I
American people of Irish descent
Democratic Party members of the Michigan House of Representatives
People from Defiance County, Ohio
Politicians from Flint, Michigan
United States Army soldiers
20th-century American politicians
People from Genesee County, Michigan